Henry Marshal (died 1206) was a medieval Bishop of Exeter.

Life

Marshal was a younger son of John Marshal and Sybilla, the sister of the earl of Salisbury, Patrick. This made him a younger brother of William Marshal, the advisor to Kings Henry II, Richard I, John and Henry III. Henry probably owed his appointment as Dean of York to his brother, and he took office as dean on 15 September 1189. He had only been consecrated a deacon that day. As Dean, he quarrelled with his superior, Geoffrey, Archbishop of York, and also served as a royal justice.

In 1194, probably owing the patronage of his brother, as well as Hubert Walter, who was Archbishop of Canterbury, Marshal was selected to fill the see of Exeter which had been vacant since 1191. He was nominated about 10 February 1194 and consecrated about 28 March 1194 at Canterbury by Hubert Walter. While bishop, he gave to his cathedral chapter and built churches in his diocese. He supposedly finished the construction of Exeter Cathedral.

Marshal died in 1206, possibly on 1 November. His tomb in Exeter Cathedral is still extant and has the bishop's effigy on it.

Citations

References

External links
 "Entry for Henry Marshal" in George Oliver's Lives of the Bishops of Exeter

12th-century births
1206 deaths
Bishops of Exeter
Deans of York
12th-century English Roman Catholic bishops
13th-century English Roman Catholic bishops
Burials at Exeter Cathedral
People from Hamstead Marshall
People from Marlborough, Wiltshire

Year of birth unknown